Richard Joe Duncan (born August 14, 1941) is a former American football kicker and punter who played 3 seasons, for the Denver Broncos (1967), Philadelphia Eagles (1968) and Detroit Lions (1969). He made 2 field goals in his career and had 5 punts for 305 yards. He also played for the Wheeling Ironmen of the Continental Football League in 1966 and in 1967.

References

1941 births
American football punters
Denver Broncos players
Philadelphia Eagles players
Detroit Lions players
American football placekickers
Living people